Saulnières refers to two communes in France:
 Saulnières, Eure-et-Loir
 Saulnières, Ille-et-Vilaine